Wu Xue (born 22 March 1980) is a female Chinese-born table tennis player who now represents the Dominican Republic.

She competed at the 2008 Summer Olympics, reaching the quarterfinals of the singles competition. She also competed in the team competition.

References

External links
 
 
 

1980 births
Living people
Dominican Republic female table tennis players
Table tennis players at the 2004 Summer Olympics
Table tennis players at the 2007 Pan American Games
Table tennis players at the 2008 Summer Olympics
Table tennis players at the 2011 Pan American Games
Olympic table tennis players of the Dominican Republic
Wu Xue
Pan American Games gold medalists for the Dominican Republic
Pan American Games silver medalists for the Dominican Republic
Pan American Games bronze medalists for the Dominican Republic
Pan American Games medalists in table tennis
Central American and Caribbean Games gold medalists for the Dominican Republic
Competitors at the 2006 Central American and Caribbean Games
Central American and Caribbean Games silver medalists for the Dominican Republic
Central American and Caribbean Games bronze medalists for the Dominican Republic
Table tennis players from Beijing
Naturalised table tennis players
Central American and Caribbean Games medalists in table tennis
Medalists at the 2007 Pan American Games
Medalists at the 2011 Pan American Games